Buloh Kasap is a mukim in Segamat District, Johor, Malaysia which is located about  from Segamat town center via Federal Route 1. Because of its location near Segamat, Buloh Kasap may also act as a satellite town of Segamat.

Name
The name Buloh Kasap was derived from a Malay word for a species of rough bamboo available there when the town was founded, especially near an Buloh Kasap old market. Buluh Kasap literally means "rough bamboo" in Malay.

History 

The old bridge of Buloh Kasap was built by Johore Government and constructed by British government during the construction of Federal Route 1. However, the British soldiers demolished a part of the bridge during World War II to stop the advance of Japanese soldiers to Singapore. After the war ended, a new bridge was constructed. This bridge was washed off during a heavy flood in 1964 together with the bridge at the 9th mile. A temporary Bailey bridge was constructed while a new bridge was being made next to it. At present the new bridge is in use and the remains of the old bridge can be seen by its side.

Battle of Buloh Kasap
This is known as Battle of Sungai Muar (Buloh Kasap) in World War II when the Japanese tried to cross the Muar River.

Geography
The mukim spans over an area of 386 km2.

Economy
Durian (Bombaceae Durio zibethinus L./Murr) is the trademark of Buloh Kasap. One must not miss the opportunity to try the fruit when passing by.

Education
Buloh Kasap has two primary schools, one secondary school, and one Muslim religion school. 
 Sek Ren Jenis Keb (C) Kasap
 Sek Kebangsaan Buloh Kasap
 Sek Menengah Kebangsaan Buloh Kasap
 Sek Agama Buloh Kasap

Notable residents 
 Datin Seri Normala Shamsuddin, former reporter of TV3; raised in Kampung Kuing Patah or Kruing Patah, Buloh Kasap, Segamat; alumnus of Sek Men Keb Batu Anam

References

Mukims of Segamat District